Wszembórz  is a village in the administrative district of Gmina Kołaczkowo, within Września County, Greater Poland Voivodeship, in west-central Poland.

See also
Church of St. Nicholas in Wszembórz

References

Villages in Września County